Jack LeVeck (born February 3, 1950) is a former American football linebacker. He played for the St. Louis Cardinals from 1973 to 1974 and for the Cleveland Browns in 1975.

References

1950 births
Living people
American football linebackers
Ohio Bobcats football players
St. Louis Cardinals (football) players
Cleveland Browns players